Metanoia, an Ancient Greek word (μετάνοια) meaning "changing one's mind", may refer to:

 Metanoia (psychology), the process of experiencing a psychotic "breakdown" and subsequent, positive psychological re-building or "healing"
 Metanoia (rhetoric), correction, a rhetorical device
 Metanoia (theology),  "conversion" and "reformation" or repentance
 Metanoia Films, a film production company
 Metanoia, a word for the act of prostration in Christianity
 Metanoia, a direct climbing route opened in 1991 by Jeff Lowe on the Eiger's north face

Music
 Metanoia (Australian band), a Christian metal band
 Metanoia (Chilean band), a Christian hardcore band
 Metanoia (For All Eternity album), 2015
 Metanoia (IAMX album), 2015
 Metanoia (Porcupine Tree album), 1998
 Metanoia (Yōsei Teikoku album), 2007 yas queens
 Metanoia (Persefone album), 2022
 Metanoia, Pt.1, an album by Druha Rika, 2012
 "Metanoia" (song), by MGMT, 2008
 "Metanoia", a song by Gerry Rafferty from Another World, 2000
 "Metanoia", a song by The Human Abstract from Midheaven, 2008
 "Metanoia", a song by King Missile from Happy Hour, 1992
 "Metanoia", a song by Japanese artist Nana Mizuki, 2019
 "Metanoia", a song by Romanian DJ/Producer "Steve", 2020

See also
 Metania, a form of bowing in the Eastern Orthodox Church